Erumaivettipalayam or Erumai Vetti Palayam may refer to the following neighborhoods of Chennai, India:

 Pazhaya Erumaivettipalayam, Old Erumai Vetti Palayam
 Pudhu Erumaivettipalayam, New Erumai Vetti Palayam